The Edward and Elizabeth Heimbach House and Carriage House is an 1890, high Victorian style, two-story,  brick house in Saint Paul, Minnesota, United States, in the West Side neighborhood.  The house has an octagonal tower and dome and a detached carriage house.

The house was nominated to the National Register of Historic Places (NRHP) in 1983.  The Heimbach House received reference number #83004628 and the listing code DR, meaning "Date Received" and nomination pending, but the listing was never finalized.

References

Carriage houses in the United States
Houses completed in 1890
Houses in Saint Paul, Minnesota